The Advantage is the debut release by American rock band The Advantage. It is their first full-length studio album.

Track listing

Original track listing 
 Mega Man 2 - Flashman
 Double Dragon 2 - Stage 2
 Goonies 2
 Bubble Bobble
 Bubble Bobble - Shark Skeleton
 Wizards and Warriors - Intro
 Bomberman 2
 Bionic Commando - P.O.W. Camp
 Super Mario Bros. 2 - Underworld
 Super Mario Bros. 2 - Overworld
 Contra - Snowfields
 Zelda - Fortress
 Batman 2
 Mega Man 3 - Dr. Wiley Stage
 Double Dragon 2 (story, and boss music)
 Castlevania 3 - Epitaph
 Ninja Gaiden - Mine Shaft
 Mario 3 - Underworld
 Blastermaster - Stage 2
 Ghost 'n' Goblins - Intro
 Ghost 'n' Goblins
 Castlevania - Stage 3
 Marble Madness
 Metal Gear - Jungle
 Contra - Boss Music
 Castlevania 3 - Evergreen

Revised track listing 
 Mega Man II - Flash Man - 2:08
 Double Dragon II - Mission 2 At the Heliport - 1:45
 Goonies II - Warp Zone - 2:19
 Bubble Bobble - Theme - 1:22
 Bubble Bobble - Shark Skeleton - 0:32
 Wizards & Warriors - Intro - 1:09
 Bomberman II - Areas 1,3 & 5 - 2:29
 Bionic Commando - P.O.W. Camp - 1:09
 Super Mario Bros. 2 - Underworld - 0:38
 Super Mario Bros. 2 - Overworld - 1:41
 Contra - Stage 5 Snow Field - 1:10
 Legend of Zelda - Dungeon - 1:08
 Batman 2 - Stage 1 - 2:36
 Mega Man III - Dr. Wily Stages 3 & 4 - 2:00
 Double Dragon II - Story & Boss - 1:59
 Castlevania III: Dracula's Curse - Epitaph - 2:04
 Ninja Gaiden - Stage 4-2 - 1:51
 Super Mario Bros. 3 - Underworld - 0:55
 Blaster Master - Stage 2 - 1:04
 Ghost 'n' Goblins - Intro - 0:04
 Ghost 'n' Goblins - Theme - 1:07
 Castlevania - Stage 3 - 2:13
 Marble Madness - Stage 2 - 1:22
 Metal Gear - Jungle - 2:20
 Contra - Boss - 2:18
 Castlevania III: Dracula's Curse - Epilogue - 1:59

Personnel
 Nick Rogers - guitar
 Ben Milner - guitar
 Spencer Seim - drums
 Carson McWhirter - bass

References

2004 debut albums
The Advantage albums
5 Rue Christine albums